Karin Maria Ilona Prokop (born 11 February 1966) is an Austrian handball player.

She was born in Tulln an der Donau, a daughter of Liese Sykora-Prokop. She competed at the 1992 Summer Olympics, where Austria placed 5th. She also participated at the 1984 Summer Olympics.

References

1966 births
Living people
People from Tulln an der Donau
Austrian female handball players
Olympic handball players of Austria
Handball players at the 1992 Summer Olympics
Handball players at the 1984 Summer Olympics